The coat of arms of Belgium bears a lion or, known as Leo Belgicus (Latin for the Belgian lion), as its charge. This is in accordance with article 193 (originally 125) of the Belgian Constitution: The Belgian nation takes red, yellow and black as colours, and as state coat of arms the Belgian lion with the motto UNITY MAKES STRENGTH. A royal decree of 17 March 1837 determines the achievement to be used in the greater and the lesser version, respectively.

History
The newly independent Kingdom of Belgium decided to base its coat of arms and flag on the symbols used by the short-lived United Belgian States. These came into being after the Southern Netherlands threw off Austrian rule. It existed as an independent polity from January to December 1790. The Duchy of Brabant had taken the lead in the so-called Brabant Revolution, the insurrection against Emperor Joseph II, and afterwards dominated the United Netherlandish States. Therefore, the Lion of Brabant (sable, a lion rampant or, armed and langued gules) came to stand for the entire federation.

This was not without precedent. In the course of the Dutch Revolt the provinces rebelling against the rule of King Philip II adopted a common seal in 1578 showing the Leo Belgicus wearing a crown and holding a sword and a sheaf of arrows. The crown stood for sovereignty, the sword for the war against Spain and the arrows for the concord and unity among the rebellious provinces. At first the lion of the (Dutch) Republic of the United Provinces had the Brabant colours or on sable. It was only when most of Brabant was reconquered by Spain in the 1580s and Holland came to dominate the Republic, that the colours of the Dutch lion (or and gules) became the definitive tinctures of the arms of the United Provinces. The Dutch Revolt likewise provided the motto "Unity Makes Strength". The inscription of the seal of 1578 reads  (through unity small things grow), a quote taken from Sallust's Jugurthine War. Soon Dutch sources used the translation . The United States of Belgium of 1790 used the Latin version . Their motto was in turn taken over and translated into French by the Kingdom of Belgium in 1831. It was only in 1958 that it was decided that the official Dutch translation should read .

Variants

Greater version
The shield is emblazoned: Sable, a lion rampant or, armed and langued gules. It is surmounted by a helmet with raised visor, with mantling or and sable and the royal crown in lieu of a crest. Behind the shield are placed a hand of justice and a sceptre with a lion. The grand collar of the Order of Leopold surrounds the shield. Two lions guardant proper support the shield as well as a lance with the national colours black, yellow and red. Underneath the compartment is placed the motto  in French or Eendracht maakt macht in Dutch, or Unity Is Strength in English. The riband of the motto is red, with black stripes on either side. The lettering is golden. Since the Royal Decree of 1837 never received an official translation, the use of the Dutch version of the motto is customary rather than official. The whole is placed on a red mantle with ermine lining and golden fringes and tassels, ensigned with the royal crown. Above the mantle rise banners with the arms of the nine provinces that constituted Belgium in 1837. They are (from dexter to sinister) Antwerp, West Flanders, East Flanders, Liège, Brabant, Hainaut, Limburg, Luxembourg and Namur.

The greater arms are used only rarely. They adorn the great seal that is affixed to laws and international treaties.

Since the province of Brabant was split into Flemish Brabant, Walloon Brabant and Brussels in 1995, the greater arms no longer reflect the present territorial divisions of the state. The changes made to the arms of the Flemish provinces as a result of this decision are not reflected in the great seal either.

Lesser version
The lesser coat of arms (as used by the Belgian federal government, on passport covers and the official sites of the monarchy and of the government) consists of the shield, the royal crown, the crossed sceptres, the collar of the Order of Leopold and the motto.

Royal versions 
A Royal Decree published on 19 July 2019 and signed on the same day, by King Philippe, reinstated the Saxonian escutcheon in all the royal versions of the family's coat of arms. The reinstatement of the shield of Saxe-Coburg-Gotha into the royal arms occurred shortly after the visit of King Philippe and Queen Mathilde to the ancestral Friedenstein Castle. The king also added translations of the motto into the three official languages of Belgium, to reflect his wish "to be the King of the whole Kingdom and of all Belgians". The latest royal decree therefore reverses previous changes made to the Royal versions of the coat arms which removed the armorial bearings of Saxony during the First World War.

Reigning King's or Queen's (Royal Arms) version
Sable, a lion rampant or, armed and langued Gules charged on the shoulder with an escutcheon of the House of Wettin. The shield is surmounted by a golden helm with the Royal Crown of Belgium and lambrequin Or and Sable. The shield surrounded by the necklace of the Order of Leopold. The supporter are two lions guardant proper each supporting a lance Or with two National Flags of Belgium. Motto: Eendracht maakt macht - L'union fait la force - Einigkeit macht stark, in gold letters, on a ribbon Gules, edged Sable. The whole is placed on a mantle Purpure with ermine lining, fringes and tassels Or and ensigned with the Royal Crown of Belgium.

Former King or Queen's version
The Royal Arms difference with a label of three points Gules, the centre point bearing the royal crown Or. The shield is surmounted by the Royal Crown of Belgium.

Duke or Duchess of Brabant version
The Royal Arms difference with a label of three points Or. The shield is surmounted by the Princely Crown of Belgium. The supporters each accompanied by a banner of gold, fringed likewise, bearing Sable, a golden lion, armed and langued Gules (Brabant).

Other Princes or Princesses of Belgium of the male and female descent in direct line of King Leopold I
The Royal Arms difference with a narrow bordure Or. The shield is surmounted by the Princely Crown of Belgium.

Other Princes or Princesses of Our Royal House
The Royal Arms difference with a narrow bordure Purpure. The shield is surmounted by the Princely Crown of Belgium.

Gallery
Coats of arms of the King

Coats of arms of the Royal family

See also

 Belgian heraldry
 Leo Belgicus

References

Citations

Bibliography
 Andrée Scufflaire. Les origines du sceau de l'Etat belge, in: Roger Harmignies, ed. Sources de l'héraldique en Europe occidentale, (Brussels, 1985) 201-225.
 Hubert de Vries. Wapens van de Nederlanden: De historische ontwikkeling van de heraldische symbolen van Nederlanden, België, hun provincies en Luxemburg (Amsterdam, 1995).
 Philippe du Bois de Ryckholt. Dictionnaire des cris et devises de la noblesse belge (Recueil généalogique et héraldique, 24.) (Brussels, 1976) p. 17-18.

External links

Belgium
National symbols of Belgium
 
Belgium
Belgium
Belgium
Belgium
Belgian heraldry
Belgium